Riederalp is a municipality in the district of Raron in the canton of Valais in Switzerland.  It was created in 2003 through the merger of Goppisberg, Greich and Ried-Mörel.

Geography
Of this area, 27.7% is used for agricultural purposes, while 42.0% is forested. Of the rest of the land, 3.0% is settled (buildings or roads) and 27.3% is unproductive land.

The altitude of the village allows good view of the Pennine Alps with some of its highest summits such as the Fletschhorn, Dom and Matterhorn.

Demographics

, 10.6% of the population are resident foreign nationals. Over the last 10 years (2000–2010 ) the population has changed at a rate of -3.9%. It has changed at a rate of -3.9% due to migration and at a rate of 3.6% due to births and deaths.

Most of the population speaks German (95.6%) as their first language, Serbo-Croatian is the second most common (1.9%) and French is the third (0.8%).

, the population was made up of 479 Swiss citizens and 57 non-citizen residents (10.63% of the population).  , children and teenagers (0–19 years old) make up 23.9% of the population, while adults (20–64 years old) make up 59.4% and seniors (over 64 years old) make up 16.7%.

, the construction rate of new housing units was 9.3 new units per 1000 residents. The vacancy rate for the municipality, was 1.33%.

Sights
The entire villages of Goppisberg and Greich are designated as part of the Inventory of Swiss Heritage Sites.

Politics
In the 2007 federal election the most popular party was the CVP which received 69.21% of the vote.  The next three most popular parties were the SVP (13.12%), the FDP (9.33%) and the SP (6.95%).  In the federal election, a total of 290 votes were cast, and the voter turnout was 69.4%.

In the 2009 Conseil d'État/Staatsrat election a total of 269 votes were cast, of which 20 or about 7.4% were invalid.  The voter participation was 68.3%, which is much more than the cantonal average of 54.67%. In the 2007 Swiss Council of States election a total of 288 votes were cast, of which 17 or about 5.9% were invalid.  The voter participation was 72.9%, which is much more than the cantonal average of 59.88%.

Economy
, Riederalp had an unemployment rate of 2%.  , there were 62 people employed in the primary economic sector and about 18 businesses involved in this sector.  9 people were employed in the secondary sector and there were 4 businesses in this sector.  239 people were employed in the tertiary sector, with 37 businesses in this sector.

 the total number of full-time equivalent jobs was 240.  The number of jobs in the primary sector was 24, all of which were in agriculture.  The number of jobs in the secondary sector was 8, all of which were in construction.  The number of jobs in the tertiary sector was 208.  In the tertiary sector; 21 or 10.1% were in wholesale or retail sales or the repair of motor vehicles, 11 or 5.3% were in the movement and storage of goods, 131 or 63.0% were in a hotel or restaurant, 1 was the insurance or financial industry, 2 or 1.0% were in education.

Of the working population, 28.9% used public transportation to get to work, and 20.9% used a private car.

Education
During the 2010–2011 school year there were a total of 21 students in the Riederalp school system.  The education system in the Canton of Valais allows young children to attend one year of non-obligatory Kindergarten. During that school year, there was one kindergarten class (KG1 or KG2) and 7 kindergarten students.  The canton's school system requires students to attend six years of primary school.  In Riederalp there were a total of 2 classes and 21 students in the primary school.  The secondary school program consists of three lower, obligatory years of schooling (orientation classes), followed by three to five years of optional, advanced schools.  All the lower and upper secondary students from Riederalp attend their school in a neighboring municipality.

Sport

Riederalp is a traffic-free village (cable car access) with a small number of permanent residents who are dwarfed by the influx of in-season tourists.

There is also a sports centre, and an indoor swimming pool at Bettmeralp.

Skilift system
Riederalp can be reached via two Aerial tramways or Gondola lifts from Mörel. The main Ski lifts are:

References

External links 

 Official Website
 
 

Ski areas and resorts in Switzerland
Car-free villages in Switzerland